Booth Grey (15 August 1740 – 4 March 1802)  was an English politician who served in the House of Commons from 1768 to 1784.

Grey was the son of Harry Grey, 4th Earl of Stamford, and his wife Lady Mary Booth daughter of George Booth, 2nd Earl of Warrington. He matriculated at Queens' College, Cambridge in 1756 and was awarded MA in 1761.  He was one of the founders of the Tarporley Hunt Club in 1762. He was elected Member of Parliament for Leicester in the 1768 general election on a joint interest with his friend Eyre Coote. He was returned without contest in 1774  and 1780. In 1784 Grey canvassed the borough, but withdrew when faced with the prospect of an expensive contest and  never stood for Parliament again.

Grey married Elizabeth Manwaring, daughter of Charles Manwaring of Brombrough, Cheshire and had a son also Booth and a daughter Elizabeth. He died on 4 March 1802.

References

1740 births
1802 deaths
British MPs 1768–1774
British MPs 1774–1780
Members of the Parliament of Great Britain for English constituencies
Alumni of Queens' College, Cambridge
Younger sons of earls